Ketki or Ketaki Kadam is an Indian television actress who appeared as Humaira on Zee TV's Qubool Hai opposite Rishabh Sinha / Vikrant Massey / Mohit Sehgal where she played the parallel lead role in the show.

Career
In 2014, after  Qubool Hai, she made an appearance as the younger Radha on Star Plus's  mythological saga Mahabharat. In the same year, she started working in Sony Entertainment Television's show produced by DJ's a Creative Unit which was earlier known under the working title Banaras ka Bunty and was then known as Hum Hain Na.  In this show, Kadam was supposed to play the parallel lead role of Satya, a girl who is in love with the lead character Bunty Kanwar Dhillon.

In 2015, she did a show Sarojini on Zee TV as Indira Singh.
In the year 2017, Kadam was cast in the role of  Shikha Vashisht in Star plus show Iss Pyaar Ko Kya Naam Doon 3 .In 2018 she did Zing TV Pyaar Pehli Baar as Vaidehi.

In a Instagram Live, she had claimed that she was part of Boogie Woogie (TV series)  and was selected, but she missed the chance to make it to Boogie Woogie due to personal reasons.

Television

References

 https://www.tellychakkar.com/tv/tv-news/ketaki-kadam-gets-back-the-sets-of-qubool-hai-after-break-her-exams .Telly Chakkar.

https://www.bollywoodlife.com/news-gossip/qubool-hai-will-ayaan-keep-his-promise-to-asad-278394/.Bollywoodlife. "Ketaki Kadam"

External links

Living people
1992 births